Little Jackie is an American musical duo consisting of Imani Coppola and Adam Pallin. Little Jackie, which derives its name from the 1989 hit song "Little Jackie Wants to Be a Star" by Lisa Lisa and Cult Jam, released a hit single in 2008 called "The World Should Revolve Around Me" from their debut album The Stoop.

Background 

Coppola was a solo singer, whose most successful single was "Legend of a Cowgirl", from the 1997 album Chupacabra. Adam Pallin is the programmer and producer of the duo.

In 2008, Coppola and Pallin signed a contract with S-Curve, an independent label owned by Steve Greenberg, to release an album. This coincided with the duo's television debut on Late Night with Conan O'Brien. Coppola originally signed as a solo act with Columbia Records.

On August 3, 2011 Little Jackie digitally released their second album, Made4TV, on Bandcamp. They digitally released their third album, Queen of Prospect Park, in 2014. They released their fourth album, Nothing Worth Listening To Part 1. I Don't Need a Therapist I Have Keith on August 22, 2022.

Discography

References

Further reading 
 Little Jackie in-depth interview by Pete Lewis, 'Blues & Soul' August 2008

American musical duos
American contemporary R&B musical groups
Musical groups from New York City
2008 establishments in New York City
Musical groups established in 2008

de:Little Jackie